The Bangladesh Telecommunication Regulatory Commission (BTRC) is an independent commission founded under the Bangladesh Telecommunication Act, 2001 (Act # 18 of 2001). The BTRC is responsible for regulating all matters related to telecommunications (wire, cellular, satellite and cable) of Bangladesh. The chairman of the commission has the status of a judge of the Bangladesh High Court. Shyam Sunder Sikder is the chairman of the commission.

History 
In 1979, the Bangladesh Telegraph and Telephone Board was created through the Bangladesh Telegraph and Telephone Board ordinance. The ordinance was revised in 1995.

The BTRC started operating from 31 January 2002 with a vision of facilitating affordable telecommunication services and increasing the teledensity to at least 10 telephones per 100 inhabitants by 2010. The ordinance was updated with the passage of Telecommunication Act (Corrected) bill in 2010.

In 2016, the salaries of the commissions and chairman was doubled by the government of Bangladesh.

Censorship 
In March 2013, BTRC was criticised by the Human Rights Watch
and other groups for banning a number of "atheist blogger" websites. Blogs banned by the BTRC included the award-winning popular blog
by Asif Mohiuddin, who had been attacked by a machete wielding group in January.

Mohiuddin was arrested the following month, along with three other bloggers
.

Chairmen

Gallery

See also

 Bangladesh Public Service Commission
 Bangladesh Civil Service
 Bangladesh Road Transport Authority

References

1976 establishments in Bangladesh
Organisations based in Dhaka
Government agencies of Bangladesh
Telecommunications in Bangladesh
Telecommunications regulatory authorities
Regulators of Bangladesh